The Political Action Committee of the Directors Guild of America (or DGA-PAC) is a United States based political action committee of the Directors Guild of America.

The DGA-PAC lobbies mainly for freedom of speech and First Amendment of the United States issues, piracy and copyright infringement, and against media consolidation. It also promotes filmmaking within the borders of the United States, and lobbies for tax breaks on both the federal and state level to keep film production within U.S. borders. 

Director Taylor Hackford is the current chairman for the DGA-PAC.

External links
 DGA-PAC Official Website

United States political action committees